The Hereditary Revenues Act 1856 (19 & 20 Vict c 43) was an Act of the Parliament of the United Kingdom.

The whole Act was repealed by section 1(1) of, and Group 2 of Part II of Schedule 1 to, the Statute Law (Repeals) Act 1989.

References

United Kingdom Acts of Parliament 1856